The Bedford VAM was a bus chassis manufactured by Bedford from 1965.

History
In August 1965, Bedford commenced production a new front-entrance coach chassis.

The VAM came with a number of engine options:
VAM3 - Bedford 300cu petrol engine
VAM5 - Bedford 330cu diesel engine
VAM14 - Leyland 400cu diesel engine
VAM70 - Bedford 466cu diesel engine
VAM75 - Bedford 500cu diesel engine, also known as BLP2

The Bedford VAM was sold extensively in the United Kingdom, as well as in export markets including Hong Kong, Australia and New Zealand.

References

VAM
Vehicles introduced in 1965